The 1981 Scottish Cup Final was played on 9 May 1981 at Hampden Park in Glasgow and was the final of the 96th Scottish Cup. Rangers and Dundee United contested the match. The first match, saw Dundee United start strongly, but fail to score. Rangers had the chance to win the match when they won a penalty at the end of normal time, but Ian Redford's effort was saved by Hamish McAlpine. After a period of extra time the match finished goalless. The replay took place on 12 May 1981, Rangers ran out easy winners, beating Dundee United, whose players appeared not to have recovered from the first match, 4-1. 

This was the last Final contested with a replay; beginning in the subsequent year, extra time and penalty shootouts were used to determine the winner on the same day.

Match details

Teams

Replay

Teams

References

External links
SFA report first match
SFA report replay

1981
Cup Final
Scottish Cup Final 1981
Scottish Cup Final 1981
20th century in Glasgow
May 1981 sports events in the United Kingdom